Laure Sansus (born 21 June 1994) is a former French rugby union player.

Biography 
Originally from Toutens, she attended the rugby school of Labastide-Beauvoir. She then joined the Saint-Orens rugby féminin before being recruited l'Avenir Fonsorbais rugby féminin (which later became Stade toulousain).

On 6 February 2016, in Bourg-en-Bresse, she made her international debut for France in a 39-0 victory over Italy.

Sansus paused her career during the 2017-18 season, before returning to play with Stade toulousain for the 2018-19 season. That season, she made her first appearance in the French women's rugby championship, as Stade toulousain lost 22-13 to Stade Maurice-Trélut. She was nominated for the 2021 World Rugby Player of the Year.

She was named the Best Player of the 2022 women's Six Nations, leading the competition in tries. On 15 May 2022, she announced she would be retiring at the end of the year. She was named in France's team to the 2021 Rugby World Cup in New Zealand.

Sansus suffered a serious knee injury in France's pool game against England. Following this, Sansus retired from rugby.

References 

Living people
1994 births
Rugby union scrum-halves
French female rugby union players